Louisiana Highway 97 (LA 97) is a state highway located in southwestern Louisiana.  It runs  in a north–south direction from the junction of U.S. Highway 90 (US 90) and LA 102 in Jennings to U.S. Highway 190 (US 190) east of Basile.

The highway connects Jennings, the seat of Jefferson Davis Parish, to one of two interchanges with Interstate 10 (I-10) that serve the small city. This portion of the route, located in neighboring Acadia Parish, is known as Evangeline Highway and connects the rural community of Evangeline to the US 190 corridor.

Route description
From the south, LA 97 begins at an intersection with US 90 and LA 102 in the city of Jennings, the seat of Jefferson Davis Parish.  From this T-intersection, US 90 heads west on Shankland Avenue toward Welsh and south on Cutting Avenue co-signed with LA 102 toward Mermentau.  LA 97 heads north on Cutting Avenue, an undivided two-lane thoroughfare, running concurrent with LA 102 for a short distance.  It then turns east onto Roberts Avenue, gaining a center turning lane.  After a few blocks, LA 97 curves to the northeast and passes a large cemetery as the surroundings become more rural.  Reaching the northeast corner of town, the center lane disappears as LA 97 passes through an interchange with I-10 at exit 65.  In the process, LA 97 crosses over the interstate, which connects with Lake Charles to the west and Lafayette to the east.  Immediately beyond the interchange, LA 97 crosses a bridge over Bayou Nezpique, a tributary of the nearby Mermentau River, into Acadia Parish.

Having crossed the parish line, LA 97 turns due north through an area known as Evangeline, where it intersects LA 100 (Old Evangeline Highway). LA 100 generally parallels I-10 to the nearby city of Crowley. After , LA 97 reaches an intersection with LA 98, connecting with the small town of Iota to the east. LA 1123, a minor rural route, also heads west from this intersection then loops back to LA 97 about  later. Continuing north through rural farmland, LA 97 departs from its straight section line alignment and curves through a point known as Redich. Here, an intersection with LA 368 connects with the parallel LA 91 north of Iota. It then straightens out once more and proceeds due north to its terminus at US 190 on the Evangeline Parish line just east of Basile.

Route classification and data
LA 97 is classified by the Louisiana Department of Transportation and Development (La DOTD) as an urban minor arterial within Jennings and as a rural major collector for the remainder of its route.  Daily traffic volume in 2013 reported an average of 7,000 vehicles through Jennings, peaking at 11,400 near US 90.  Outside of Jennings, the traffic volume steadily dropped off until it reached an average of 1,170 vehicles as the route approaches US 190.

The posted speed limit is generally , reduced to  through Jennings.

History

Pre-1955 route numbering

In the original Louisiana Highway system in use between 1921 and 1955, the modern LA 97 was designated as State Route 371.  It was added to the state highway system by an act of the state legislature in 1928.

The southern terminus of Route 371 was located three blocks west from that of the present LA 97.  At the time, US 90 followed Main Street rather than the parallel Cutting Avenue.  The route remained the same until the 1955 Louisiana Highway renumbering, although unnecessary concurrencies with the designations of State Route 222 and State Route 370 were eliminated at some point.

Post-1955 route history
LA 97 was created in 1955 as a straight renumbering of former State Route 371.

Although no major changes have been made to the route of LA 97 since its creation, there have been several improvements.  Shortly following the 1955 renumbering, a series of right-angle turns were smoothed out, most notably between Redich and Basile in Acadia Parish.  By the 1980s, the portion of Main Street in Jennings carrying US 90 was returned to local control.  The highway was realigned to follow the parallel Cutting Avenue co-signed with LA 102, and the southern terminus of LA 97 was then moved three blocks east to its present location.  The bridge across Bayou Nezpique at the Jefferson Davis–Acadia parish line was replaced around 1990.  An additional improvement occurred when I-10 was constructed through the area in the early 1960s.  The interstate was opened to traffic eastward from Jennings to Crowley in March 1963, partially opening the interchange with LA 97.  The interchange was completed with the opening of the section from Jennings westward to Welsh two years later.

Future
Under this plan of "right-sizing" the state highway system, the portion of LA 97 between US 90 and I-10 in Jennings is proposed for deletion as it does not meet a significant interurban travel function.

Major intersections

See also

References

External links

Maps / GIS Data Homepage, Louisiana Department of Transportation and Development

0097
Transportation in Jefferson Davis Parish, Louisiana
Transportation in Acadia Parish, Louisiana